The politics of Los Angeles County leans Democratic. Los Angeles County has voted Democratic in every Presidential election since 1988, with every Democratic nominee winning the county by a margin of at least 25 points since 1992. Los Angeles County has voted for the Democratic candidate in most of the presidential elections in the past four decades, although it did vote twice for Dwight Eisenhower (1952, 1956), Richard Nixon (1968, 1972), and Ronald Reagan (1980, 1984), the latter two of whom were Californians. From 1920 to 1984 it could be considered as a reliable bellwether county which always voted for the eventual national winner.  Los Angeles went against the overall national picture in 1988, 2000, 2004 and 2016.

Northern Los Angeles County, which includes the cities of Santa Clarita, Lancaster, and Palmdale, has historically been a Republican stronghold, but has been shifting Democratic in recent elections. All three cities voted for Hillary Clinton in 2016 and Joe Biden in 2020. The region is represented in the House of Representatives by Republicans Mike Garcia and Kevin McCarthy. The region currently leans Democratic in presidential elections, but less so than the rest of the county.

Voter registration statistics

Congressional districts
In the United States House of Representatives, Los Angeles County is divided among 18 congressional districts:
 
 
 
 
 
 
 
 
 
 
 
 
 
 
 
  and
 .

In the California State Senate, Los Angeles County is divided among 15 legislative districts:
 ,
 ,
 ,
 ,
 ,
 ,
 ,
 ,
 ,
 ,
 ,
 ,
 ,
 , and
 .

In the California State Assembly, Los Angeles County is divided among 24 legislative districts:
 ,
 ,
 ,
 ,
 ,
 ,
 ,
 ,
 ,
 ,
 ,
 ,
 ,
 ,
 ,
 ,
 ,
 ,
 ,
 ,
 ,
 ,
 , and 
 .

On November 4, 2008, Los Angeles County was almost evenly split over Proposition 8 which amended the California Constitution to ban same-sex marriages. The county voted for the amendment 50.1% with a margin of 2,385 votes.

Cities by population and voter registration

See also
 Los Angeles County, California#Politics

Notes

References

History of Los Angeles County, California
Los